Rostanga byga is a species of sea slug, a dorid nudibranch, a marine gastropod mollusc in the family Discodorididae.

Distribution
This species was described from the Caribbean Sea. Its distribution includes also Rio de Janeiro State, southeastern Brazil.Rudman, W.B., 2006 (October18) Rostanga byga Er. Marcus, 1958. [In] Sea Slug Forum. Australian Museum, Sydney.

Description
This doric nudibranch is bright orange to reddish orange in colour, and the dorsum is covered with caryophyllidia; it is very similar to other species of Rostanga. The colour is very uniform, but the rhinophores have white tips.Photographs of a specimen from Florida

The maximum recorded body length is 20 mm.

Ecology
The prey of Rostanga byga includes the sponge Mycale microsigmatosa''.

References

Discodorididae
Gastropods described in 1958
Taxa named by Ernst Marcus (zoologist)